The Diary of Anne Frank is a stage adaptation of the posthumously published 1947 book The Diary of a Young Girl by Anne Frank. It premiered on Broadway at the Cort Theatre in 1955. Its script also primarily formed the basis of the Academy Award-winning 1959 film adaptation.

Original Broadway production
The play is a  dramatization by Frances Goodrich and Albert Hackett, and opened at the Cort Theatre on Broadway on October 5, 1955. The play was produced by Kermit Bloomgarden and directed by Garson Kanin, with scenic design by Boris Aronson and lighting design by Lee Watson. The cast was led by Joseph Schildkraut as Otto Frank, Susan Strasberg as  Anne Frank, David Levin as Peter van Daan, Gusti Huber as Edith Frank, Jack Gilford as Mr. Dussel, Dennie Moore as Mrs. van Daan, and Lou Jacobi as Mr. van Daan. The play transferred to fellow Broadway theatre, the Ambassador Theatre in February 1957, and closed there on June 22 after 717 performances. The play then traveled the United States with the original cast, save for Millie Perkins playing Anne Frank.

Awards
The play received the Tony Award for Best Play and was nominated for Best Actress (Susan Strasberg), Best Scenic Design (Boris Aronson), Best Costume Design (Helene Pons), Best Director (Garson Kanin). The play received the Pulitzer Prize for Drama for Albert Hackett and Frances Goodrich. Susan Strasberg won the 1956 Theatre World Award. The play received the 1956 New York Drama Critics Circle award for best play.

1997 version
The Diary of Anne Frank was presented in June 1997, in a revision of the Goodrich and Hackett adaptation by Wendy Kesselman, directed by James Lapine. Otto Frank was played by George Hearn, Anne by Natalie Portman, Mrs. Van Daan by Linda Lavin, Mr. Van Daan by Harris Yulin and Edith Frank by Sophie Hayden. The play previewed in Boston in the Colonial Theatre before opening at Manhattan's Music Box Theatre in December 1997.

The production received two nominations for 1998 Tony Award for Best Revival of a Play and for Best Featured Actress (Linda Lavin). It received two Drama Desk nominations: for Outstanding Featured Actor (Harris Yulin) and Outstanding Featured Actress (Linda Lavin).

References

External links

 

Broadway plays
Pulitzer Prize for Drama-winning works
Tony Award-winning plays
Cultural depictions of Anne Frank
1955 plays
Plays based on books
American plays adapted into films
Works based on diaries
Plays about the Holocaust